Lisa Jarnot (born 1967) is an American poet.  She was born in Buffalo, New York and studied literature at the State University of New York at Buffalo.  In 1994 she received an MFA in creative writing from Brown University. She has lived in San Francisco, Boulder, Providence, and London. Since the mid-1990s she has been a resident of New York City. She has taught creative writing and literature at Brooklyn College, Long Island University, Naropa University, and the Poetry Project in New York City.

Writing

Jarnot has edited two poetry journals (No Trees, 1987–1990, and Troubled Surfer, 1991–1992) as well as The Poetry Project Newsletter and An Anthology of New (American) Poetry (Talisman House Publishers, 1997). She is the author of four full-length collections of poetry: Some Other Kind of Mission (1996), Ring of Fire (2001), Black Dog Songs (2003) and Night Scenes (2008). Her biography of the San Francisco poet Robert Duncan (Robert Duncan: The Ambassador From Venus: A Comprehensive Biography) was published in August 2012 and was shortlisted for the National Book Critics Circle Award, the Randy Shilts Award for Gay Non-Fiction, and received Honorable Mention in Literature from American Publishers Awards program. Joie De Vivre: Selected Poems: 1992-2012 was published by City Lights in May  2013. Her work has been published in numerous anthologies including Poetry 180 edited by Billy Collins, Great American Prose Poems edited by David Lehman, and the Norton Anthology of Postmodern American Poetry, 2013.

Regarding Jarnot's Book The Ring of Fire Patrick Pritchett writes, "This is where the human stands before itself as the sign of everything that can be transfigured – in other words, as the site of poetic possibility."

She works as a freelance writer, teacher, and gardener and lives in Jackson Heights, Queens. She is the owner and operator of Sunnyside Landscaping and is a founding member of a free school collective called the Central Park Forest Nursery. Since 2017 she has been a seminary student at New York Theological Seminary and is currently a minister-in-training through the Reformed Church in America at Bowne Street Community Church.

Awards and honors
1998 New York Foundation for the Arts Grantee
2005 New York Foundation for the Arts Grantee
2012 Triangle Publishing Randy Shilts Award for Gay Non-fiction, finalist, Robert Duncan, The Ambassador from Venus: A Comprehensive Biography
2012 National Book Critics Circle Award (Biography), finalist, Robert Duncan, The Ambassador from Venus: A Comprehensive Biography

Bibliography (selected)
The Fall of Orpheus, Shuffaloff Press, 1993.
Sea Lyrics, Situation Press, 1996.
Some Other Kind of Mission, Burning Deck Press, 1996.
Heliopolis, rem press, 1999.
The Eightfold Path, a+bend Press, 2000.
Ring of Fire, Zoland Books, 2001.
One's Own Language, The Institute of Further Studies, 2002.
Black Dog Songs, Flood Editions, 2003.
Reptile House, Bookthug, 2005.
Chansons du chien noir (Black Dog Songs Chapbook in French), Format Americain, 2005.
Iliad XXII: The Death of Hector, Atticus/Finch Books, 2006.
Jess: To and From the Printed Page. John Ashbery, Thomas Evans; (Independent Curators International, 2007) 
Night Scenes, Flood Editions, 2008.
"Amedellin Nosegay Cooperative", The Song Cave, 2010.
Robert Duncan, The Ambassador from Venus: A Biography, University of California Press, 2012. 
Joie de Vivre: Selected Poems 1992–2012 (City Lights, 2013)

References

External links
 

1967 births
Living people
American women poets
21st-century American poets
Brooklyn College faculty
21st-century American women writers
Brown University alumni